USO most often refers to the United Service Organizations, a nonprofit that provides services to United States service members and families.

USO may also refer to:

People and characters
 USO (rapper) (born 1981), Danish rapper
 The Usos, wrestling tag team
 Üso Ewin, a character from the anime series Mobile Suit Victory Gundam

Places
 USO, Udaipur Solar Observatory, in Rajasthan, India

Groups, organizations, companies
 USO, Unión Sindical Obrera, a Spanish trade union
 United States Oil Fund, NYSE Arca symbol

Other uses
 USO, Unidentified submerged object
 USO, Unilateral salpingo-oopherectomy, removal of an ovary and a fallopian tube
 USO, Universal service obligation, to provide services to every resident of a country
 , a WWII U.S. Navy Liberty ship

See also 

 USO 50th Anniversary silver dollar
 
 
 Euso (disambiguation)
 Usos (disambiguation)